The 1998–99 Moldovan "A" Division season is the 8th since its establishment. A total of 16 teams are contesting the league.

League table

Promotion/relegation play-off

References
 Moldova. Second Level 1998/99 - RSSSF

External links
 "A" Division - moldova.sports.md

Moldovan Liga 1 seasons
2
Moldova